The 2019 The Nationals is the inaugural season of The Nationals, an electronic sports (Esports) league in the Philippines. The season features three titles, Dota 2, Mobile Legends: Bang Bang, and Tekken 7 with two conferences each.

Teams

The Road to The Nationals

The Nationals was officially launched on July 24, 2018, in a press conference. In the same event, the "Road to The Nationals" a series of qualification tournament to determine the players of the six franchise teams to compete in The Nationals' inaugural season was announced. Three qualifiers for each of The Nationals three video game titles will be held. These tournaments will run from August to October 2018 with the qualifying eight teams from each of the three titles competing in the final qualification tournament at the Electronic Sports and Gaming Summit 2018 to be held from October 27 to 28 at the SMX Convention Center in Pasay.

The winning teams and individuals (for competitors in single-player titles) will be given millions of pesos in prize money and a chance to get drafted in one of the six franchise teams of The Nationals.

Players
The players of the inaugural 2019 The Nationals season will be drafted among the winners of the Road to The Nationals qualification tournaments to be held in the latter half of 2018. Minors are eligible to compete if they have waivers from their parents consenting their participation.

Sponsorship
The first financial firm to become a sponsor of the league's qualification tournament, The Road to The Nationals, was the Rizal Commercial Banking Corporation (RCBC) which announced its sponsorship deal with the league in October 2018 to specifically promote its MyWallet Virtual Card service.

Conferences

Dota 2

First Conference
After playing a total of 40 games in the group phase, the Cignal Ultra Warriors secured a bye to the best-of-five grand finals while PLDT-Smart Omega and Suha-XCTN Punishers played against each other in the best-of-three playoffs. Suha Execretion eliminated Omega in the playoffs to advance to the grand final where they were defeated by Cignal. Cignal clinched the first conference Dota 2 title with a 3–2 win in the grand final.

The Best Player of the final series is Fernando Mendoza (Nando) of Cignal who averaged 9.4 kills, 6 assists, and 650 GPM per game.

Group stage standing

Final round

Second Conference
The second conference began on May 1, 2019.

Mobile Legends: Bang Bang

First Conference 
The Mobile Legends First Conference marked the league debut of the STI eOlympians in The Nationals. After playing 31 games in the group stage (including tiebreaker), PLDT-Smart Omega became the top seed with the Cignal Ultra Warriors becoming second. PLDT-Smart Omega became the first ever The Nationals MLBB Champion after sweeping Cignal Ultra Warriors in the best-of-five finals series, 3 games to none.

Group stages (Standings)

Final round

Second Conference
A second conference was held for Mobile Legends: Bang Bang.

Tekken 7
Two conferences was held for Tekken 7.

References

The Nationals
The Nationals (esports)
The Nationals